Major General Altay Ramazan oglu Mehdiyev was the Commander of Azerbaijani Air Forces.

Career 
General Mehdiev originates from the city of Lankaran.

Air force commander 
After the assassination of the Commander of Azerbaijani Air Force, Lieutenant General Rail Rzayev on February 11, 2009 the position remained unfilled until May 12, 2009 when President Ilham Aliyev appointed Mehdiyev to take over the command. Before the appointment, Mehdiyev served as the Chief of Staff of Azerbaijani Armed Forces in Nakhchivan. He's considered to be a professional, well trained for air force operations.

Mehdiyev was awarded with Veten Ughrunda Medal (In the Name of Motherland) for service to his country on June 22, 2006.

Dismissal 
He was dismissed on 18 November 2013. He was appointed to the post of rector of the War College of the Azerbaijani Armed Forces.

References

21st-century Azerbaijani Air Forces personnel
Living people
Year of birth missing (living people)